Robert Emmets GAA was a Gaelic Athletic Association club based in Monkstown, County Cork, Ireland. It competed in competitions organized by the Carrigdhoun division of Cork. The club was primarily successful in Gaelic football and won the Carrigdhoun Junior Football Championship on three occasions.  The club is now defunct.

Achievements
 Carrigdhoun Junior Football Championship Winners (3) 1950, 1954, 1956  | Runners-Up 1958, 1962
 South-East Under 21 "A" Football Championship Runners-Up (1) 1980

References
 Cork GAA finals

Gaelic games clubs in County Cork
Hurling clubs in County Cork
Former Gaelic Athletic Association clubs in County Cork